Cecil Burkett "Tex" Grigg (February 15, 1891 – September 5, 1968) was an American football player and coach. He played running back for eight seasons in the National Football League (NFL) for the Canton Bulldogs, the Rochester Jeffersons, the New York Giants, and the Frankford Yellow Jackets. He made his professional debut in 1919 with the Bulldogs who were still members of the Ohio League, the direct predecessor to the NFL. Grigg then went on to coach for many years as Jess Neely's backfield coach at Rice.

Head coaching record

College football

References

 

1891 births
1968 deaths
American football running backs
Austin Kangaroos football coaches
Austin Kangaroos men's basketball coaches
Basketball coaches from Tennessee
Canton Bulldogs players
Canton Bulldogs (Ohio League) players
Dallas Hilltoppers football coaches
Dallas Hilltoppers football players
Frankford Yellow Jackets players
New York Giants players
Rice Owls baseball coaches
Rice Owls football coaches
Rochester Jeffersons coaches
Rochester Jeffersons players
Players of American football from Nashville, Tennessee